Cineas was a man from Thessaly and an important adviser of King Pyrrhus. He had a  reputation for great wisdom and was a pupil of Demosthenes the orator and was the only man who could be compared in skill with Demosthenes. Pyrrhus held him in high regard. Cineas was an Epicurean according to Cicero and Plutarch. Plutarch wrote that Pyrrhus sent Cineas to many cities in Greece as an ambassador and "used to say that more cities had been won for him by the eloquence of Cineas than by his own arms; and he continued to hold Cineas in especial honour and to demand his services."

Plutarch wrote that prior to Pyrrhus undertaking the Pyrrhic War, Cineas tried to dissuade him from waging war against Rome in Italy and urged him to be satisfied with the possessions he already had. He asked Pyrrhus a series of questions: how he would use a victory against the Romans, what he would do after taking Italy, whether his expedition would stop with the taking of Sicily (according to Plutarch, Pyrrhus wanted to take Sicily as well as Italy) and, since Pyrrhus said that he would go on to take Libya and Carthage so that no enemies who threatened him would offer further resistance, he asked what he would do "when we have got everything subject to us". The reply of Pyrrhus to the last question was: "We shall be much at ease, and we'll drink bumpers, my good man, every day, and we'll gladden one another's hearts with confidential talks." Cineas got Pyrrhus where he wanted in order to make his point and said: "Surely this privilege is ours already, and we have at hand, without taking any trouble, those things to which we hope to attain by bloodshed and great toils and perils, after doing much harm to others and suffering much ourselves." Cassius Dio wrote that Cineas saw the folly of Pyrrhus' expedition and tried to dissuade him. He wrote: [Pyrrhus] intended by his prowess to rule the whole earth, whereas Cineas urged him to be satisfied with his own possessions, which were sufficient for enjoyment. But the king's fondness for war and fondness for leadership prevailed against the advice of Cineas and caused him to depart in disgrace from both Sicily and Italy, after losing in all of the battles countless thousands of his own forces."

Pyrrhus did not listen to Cineas. Ostensibly, he waged war against Rome to support the Greek city of Tarentum, in southern Italy, in a dispute with the Romans. Before sailing to Tarentum, Pyrrhus sent Cineas to that city in advance with some troops. This helped to sway the people of Tarentum from attempting a reconciliation with Rome.

After his victory in the Battle of Heraclea, Pyrrhus sent his ambassador Cineas to negotiate with the Romans. Cineas offered to free the Roman prisoners, also promised to help the Romans with the subjugation of Italy and asked only friendship and immunity for Tarentum in return. Many senators were inclined towards peace (in Plutarch's account) or a truce (in Cassius Dio's account) because the Romans would have to face a larger army as the Italic peoples who were allies of Pyrrhus had now joined him. However, Appius Claudius Caecus, who was old and blind and had been confined to his house, had himself carried to the senate house in a litter. He said that Pyrrhus was not to be trusted and that a truce (or peace) was not advantageous to the state. He called for Cineas to be dismissed from the city immediately and for Pyrrhus to be told to withdraw to his country and to make his propositions from there. The senate voted unanimously to send away Cineas that very day and to continue the war for so long as Pyrrhus was in Italy. Plutarch wrote that Cineas assessed that the Romans now had twice as many soldiers as those who fought at the Battle of Heraclea and that "there were many times as many Romans still who were capable of bearing arms."

See also 
 Pyrrhic victory

Notes

References 
 Cassius Dio, Roman History, Vol 1, Books 1–11, (Loeb Classical Library), Loeb, 1989;  
 Chisholm, Hugh, ed. (1911). "Cineas". Encyclopædia Britannica 
 Plutarch,  Plutarch Lives, Vol. 9, Demetrius and Antony. Pyrrhus and Gaius Marius (Loeb Classical Library), Loeb, 1920; ASIN B00E6TGQKO 

3rd-century BC Greek people
Ancient Greek statesmen
Hellenistic Thessalians
Ancient Epirus
Ancient Thessalian statesmen
Pyrrhus of Epirus